The 2022 Alabama State Hornets football team represented Alabama State University as a member of the East Division of the Southwestern Athletic Conference (SWAC) during the 2022 NCAA Division I FCS football season. Led by first-year head coach Eddie Robinson, the Wildcats played their home games at New ASU Stadium in Montgomery, Alabama.

Previous season

The Hornets finished the 2021 season with a record of 5–6, 3–5 SWAC play to finish in a tie for fourth place in the East Division.

Schedule

Game summaries

vs. Howard

Miles

at UCLA

Prairie View A&M

at Texas Southern

No. 8 Jackson State

Mississippi Valley State

vs. Alabama A&M

at Bethune–Cookman

Florida A&M

Arkansas–Pine Bluff

References

Alabama State
Alabama State Hornets football seasons
Alabama State Hornets football